Note: The surname Pigou forms part of the terms Pigou Club and Pigouvian tax, both derived from the name of the English economist Arthur Cecil Pigou.

Pigou is an English surname of Huguenot derivation.

The Pigou family originated from Amiens in France. The name was related to pique or pike, and the Pigou arms consist of three pike heads. Two sons of Lawrence Pigou of Amiens – Jacques and John – fled from persecution in France and settled with their families in England in about 1685. All branches of the Pigou family became involved in trade with India.

Family of Jacques Pigou
The descendants of Jacques died out but there were two notable members of this family. The Gentleman's Magazine (January 1792) reprinted the letter of Captain Peter Pigou (1732–1783) describing his adventures in conveying a huge hydraulic organ from Madras to Aurengabad, for a speculative sale to the Nizam.

Thomas Pigou (1765–1796), the son of Peter Pigou was an officer in the British East India Company and a close friend of Francis Light. He succeeded Light as governor of Penang.

Family of John Pigou
John’s grandson Anselm Frederick Pigou (1683–1749) was a successful merchant with dealings in America.
His son Frederick Pigou (1711–1792) was a Director of the East India Company, and also had connections with the tea trade to America. He was also co-owner of the gunpowder factory at Dartford, Kent. 
Subsequent generations followed these threads, being typically Artillery officers and serving in the Indian Army.
All existing members of the Pigou family descend from Frederick. Many have emigrated to Canada, Australia and New Zealand. The Pigou vineyards are near Marlborough, New Zealand.

Pigou family members
 Arthur Cecil Pigou (1877–1959), English economist
 Elfrida Pigou (1911–1960), Canadian mountaineer
 William Harry Pigou (1818–1858), surgeon and pioneer photographer in India
 Major-General Arthur Comyn Pigou (1826–1903)
 Francis Pigou (1832–1916), dean of Bristol
 Louisa Pigou, married Henry Harford (1758–1834), last proprietor of Maryland
 Georgina Pigou, mother of English MP Hugo Francis Meynell Ingram (1822–1871)
 Catherine Pigou, mother of English playwright and MP Miles Peter Andrews (    –1814)
 Nina Pigou, wife of Alfred Inglis and mother in law of Air Marshal Victor Goddard (1897–1987)